Angurud (also Romanized as Angūrūd; also known as Angūrd) is a village in Ahmadabad Rural District, Takht-e Soleyman District, Takab County, West Azerbaijan Province, Iran. At the 2006 census, its population was 763, in 141 families.

References 

Populated places in Takab County